Mykyta Sytnykov (born 23 June 2004) is a Ukrainian professional footballer who plays as midfielder for FC Oleksandriya.

Career
Born in Dnipro, Sytnykov is a product of the different local youth sportive school systems.

In January 2021 he signed a contract with the Ukrainian Premier League club FC Oleksandriya. He made his debut on 26 October 2021, coming on as a substitute in a win against FC Metalist 1925 Kharkiv in the Round of 16 of the Ukrainian Cup.

References

External links 
 
 

2004 births
Living people
Footballers from Dnipro
Ukrainian footballers
FC Oleksandriya players
Ukraine youth international footballers
Association football midfielders